New Paradise Laboratories (NPL) is a 501(c)(3) experimental theater ensemble based in Philadelphia, Pennsylvania. Founded in 1996, NPL collaborates with artists from a variety of disciplines, including web designers, visual artists, writers, philosophers, composers, and architects, as well as performers who work together to create interactive theater works and immersive experiences.

History 

Founded in 1996 by Whit MacLaughlin, New Paradise Laboratories (NPL) has created an average of one original performance work each year since its founding. Their work has been presented as part of the FringeArts Festival (formerly Philadelphia Live Arts Festival and Philly Fringe), the Humana Festival of New American Plays, Children's Theatre Company, and in residencies with universities all over the United States.

Grants and recognition
 2000: Obie Award for "The Fab 4 Reach the Pearly Gates"
 2002: Pew Charitable Trusts Fellowship in Performance Art Grant to Whit MacLaughlin
 2003: National Endowment for the Arts Pennsylvania Council on the Arts Artistic Advancement Grant
 2003: Pennsylvania Performing Arts on Tour artist
 2004: Creative Capital MAP Fund grant recipient
 2006: "Best of Philly: Theater Company" by Philadelphia Magazine
 2007: F. Otto Haas Emerging Artist Award recipient Matt Saunders. Among the nominees were also Lee Ann Etzold and Jeb Kreager.
 2010: MAP Fund grant recipient
 2010: Jorge Cousineau named "Artist of the Year" by Philadelphia Weekly

Company members

 Whit MacLaughlin (Artistic Director)  -  he has conceived, directed, and designed 20 original performance works with the company since its inception in 1996. Since 1978, he has acted in, directed, or written over 100 theatre productions.
 KC Chun-Manning (Managing Director) - served from 2015 - 2020 and remains active on Board of Directors.
 Pete Angevine (Interim Consulting Managing Director) - Began serving in 2020
Emilie Krause (Performer) - has worked with NPL since 2011
 Kevin Meehan (Performer) - has worked with NPL since 2011
 Matteo Jones Scammell (Performer) - has worked with NPL since 2011
 Julia Frey (Performer) - has worked with NPL since 2011
 Lee Ann Etzold (Performer) - a founding member
 McKenna Kerrigan (Performer) - has worked with NPL since 1999
 Jeb Kreager (Performer) - a founding member, he has performed and co-created 13 shows
 Mary McCool (Performer) - a founding member
 Aaron Mumaw (Performer) - a founding member
 René Ligon Hartl (Performer) - a founding member
 Matt Saunders (Designer/Performer)
 Jorge Cousineau (Video and Sound Design)

Productions

References

External links 

 NewParadiseLaboratories.org
NewParadiseLaboratories at Facebook
Video: Whit MacLaughlin Interview (2011)

Show websites
 Extremely Public Displays
 Fatebook
 Freedom Club

Associate
 FringeArts
 Philadelphia Live Arts and Philly Fringe Festival

Theatre companies in Philadelphia
Culture of Philadelphia